Zakaltus is a rural locality (a selo) in Kabansky District, Republic of Buryatia, Russia. The population was 495 as of 2010. There are 7 streets.

Geography 
Zakaltus is located 6 km southwest of Kabansk (the district's administrative centre) by road. Timlyuy is the nearest rural locality.

References 

Rural localities in Kabansky District